Werd may refer to:

 WERD (historic radio station), the first radio station owned and programmed by African Americans.
 Werd (Lake Constance), the main island of the small Lake Constance island group in Switzerland. 
 Werd (Zürich), a district of the city of Zürich in Switzerland.
 Werdhölzli, an area of Zürich nearby Werdinsel.
 Werdinsel, a Limmat river island in Zürich.
 Werd, the German name for Vărd village, Chirpăr Commune, Sibiu County, Romania
 WERD, a segment on The Late Show with Stephen Colbert